Patricia Anne "Tish" Murtha (14 March 1956 – 13 March 2013) was a British social documentary photographer best known for documenting marginalised communities, social realism and working class life in Newcastle upon Tyne and the North East of England.

The posthumously published books of her work are Youth Unemployment (2017), Elswick Kids (2018) and Juvenile Jazz Bands (2020).

Background and education
Murtha was born on 14 March 1956 in South Shields, North East, England. In 1976, aged 20, she left home to study at the School of Documentary Photography at The University of Wales, Newport, set up by Magnum Photos member David Hurn. After graduating in 1978, she returned to Newcastle and set out to document “marginalized communities from the inside” - unlike other photographers who came to document social poverty in the region at the time Murtha didn’t just document it, she actually lived it, as the third of ten children of Irish descent, brought up in a council house in Elswick in Newcastle, she captured the lives of her friends, family and the community around her while she was on a job scheme for the unemployed.

Career
This led to the then controversial exhibitions Juvenile Jazz Bands (1979) and Youth Unemployment (1981), which was raised as a subject of debate in the House of Commons. Around this time Murtha was also commissioned to document the campaign Save Scotswood Works (1979) and provided photographs for the THAC (Tyneside Housing Aid Centre) publications Do you know what this is doing to my little girl? - Home Truths in the Year Of The Child (1979) and Burying The Problem (1980), highlighting social poverty on Tyneside.

In 1982, Murtha moved to London, where she worked on London By Night (1983) along with Bill Brandt, Brian Griffin and Peter Marlow. The group exhibition documenting Soho and the commercial sex industry, was exhibited in The Photographers’ Gallery, London. Murtha lived in the capital for five years, working on commission for Edward Arnold Publishers. She also photographed emerging celebrities Julian Clary and Philip Herbert and took the first headshots of a young Declan Donnelly upon her return to the north east in 1987.

Between 2008 and 2012, Murtha's work was selected for three Arts Council / British Council Collection exhibitions; No Such Thing as Society: Photography in Britain 1967–1987: From the Arts Council Collection and the British Council Collection showcased "a radically new picture of these two turbulent decades"; Unpopular Culture – Grayson Perry Selects from the Arts Council Collection examined 70 works by 50 artists Perry describes as belonging to a period "before British art became fashionable"; Observadores - Fotógrafos Da Cena Britânica Desde 1930 Até Hoje (Observers: British Photography and the British Scene) was "the first exhibition ever staged in Brazil to chart a course through British photography in modern times."

In 2011, the group exhibition Paul Graham, Tish Murtha and Markéta Luskačová formed part of Look 11: Liverpool International Photography Festival.

Posthumously, Murtha's work was included in the group exhibitions True/Grit - A Celebration of Northern Realism (2013), For Ever Amber (2015). and Childhoods - 1977 to 2016 (2016).

Death and legacy
On 13 March 2013—the day before what would have been her 57th birthday—Murtha died after suffering a sudden brain aneurysm.

She is survived by her daughter, Ella, and grandson, Dexter.

Paul Reas and Lulu Preece at University of South Wales began scanning the Tish Murtha archive, which contains thousands of previously unseen images. Her daughter Ella published the book Youth Unemployment through Bluecoat Press in November 2017 after a successful Kickstarter campaign.

Publications

Publications by Murtha
Youth Unemployment. Liverpool: Bluecoat, 2017. . Hardback first edition.
Liverpool: Bluecoat, 2018. . Paperback second edition.
Elswick Kids. Liverpool: Bluecoat, 2018. . Hardback.
Juvenile Jazz Bands. Liverpool: Bluecoat, 2020. . Hardback.

Zines by Murtha
Newport Tip 1978. Southport: Café Royal, 2018. Edition of 500 copies.
Newport Doc Photo Class of '78. Southport: Café Royal, 2018. Four titles in a box, Newport Tip 1978, Army Snow Clearance Bridgend 1978, The Queens Jubilee Newport 1977, and Newport Doc Photo Class of '78. Edition of 150 copies.
The Queen's Silver Jubilee Newport 1977. Southport: Café Royal, 2018.

Books and exhibition catalogues with contributions by Murtha
 The book of the year. London: Ink Links, 1980. ISSN 0144-5367.
 No Such Thing as Society: Photography in Britain 1967–1987: From the Arts Council Collection and the British Council Collection. London: Hayward, 2007. By David Alan Mellor. .
 Unpopular Culture: Grayson Perry Selects from the Arts Council Collection. London: Hayward, 2008. By Grayson Perry and Blake Morrison. 
 Observadores: Fotografos da Cena Britanica de 1930 Ate Hoje. São Paulo: SESI, 2012. 
 For Ever Amber: Stories From A Film & Photography Collection. Leeds: Pressision, 2015.
London Nights. London: Hoxton Mini Press. 2018. . With essays by Anna Sparham and poetry by Inua Ellams. Published in conjunction with an exhibition at the Museum of London.

Other publications
 Do you know what this is doing to my little girl? - Home Truths in the Year Of The Child - a THAC Report. Tyneside Free Press Workshop, 1979. .
 Burying The Problem - a THAC Report. Tyneside Free Press Workshop, 1980. 
 Photoworks. Issue 10. Brighton: Photoworks, 2008. .
 History of Photography, Volume 33, Number 4: Crushing The Social. Routledge, November 2009. .
 Wombat: Portfolio No. 24: Tish Murtha. Paris: Wombat, September 2016.
 Loose Associations. Volume 4, Number 2: Various. London: The Photographers' Gallery, 2018. . Includes work by Murtha and Alex Prager.

Collections
Murtha's work is held in the following public collections:
 Arts Council of Great Britain
 British Council
 The AmberSide Collection
 UK UNESCO Memory of the World Register
 National Portrait Gallery, London

Exhibitions

Solo exhibitions
 Youth Unemployment, Side Gallery, Newcastle upon Tyne, England and touring, 1981 
 Juvenile Jazz Bands, Side Gallery, Newcastle upon Tyne, England and touring, 1979
 Save Scotswood Works, Side Gallery, Newcastle upon Tyne, England and touring, 1979
 Tish Murtha: Works 1976 – 1991, The Photographers' Gallery, London, 2018. Co-curated by Gordon MacDonald and Val Williams.
 Tish Murtha - England 78 - 81, Willy Brandt Haus, Berlin, 2019

Group exhibitions
 Childhoods - 1977 to 2016, 2016, Side Gallery, Newcastle upon Tyne, UK
 For Ever Amber, 2015, Laing Art Gallery, Newcastle upon Tyne, UK
 True/Grit – A Celebration of Northern Realism, 2013, Side Gallery, Newcastle upon Tyne, UK
 Observers: British Photography and the British Scene, 2012, Serviço Social da Indústria (SESI), São Paulo Visual Arts Month, São Paulo, Brazil
 Paul Graham, Tish Murtha and Markéta Luskačová, Look 11: Liverpool International Photography Festival, 2011, Baltic Triangle, Liverpool, UK
 Unpopular Culture – Grayson Perry Selects from the Arts Council Collection, 2008-2010, Hayward Gallery, London, and touring (De La Warr Pavilion, Bexhill-on-Sea; Harris Museum, Preston; Royal Museum and Art Gallery, Canterbury; DLI Museum & Durham Art Gallery, Durham; Southampton City Art Gallery, Southampton; Aberystwyth Arts Centre, Aberystwyth; Scarborough Art Gallery, Scarborough; Longside Gallery, Wakefield; Victoria Art Gallery, Bath; Mead Gallery, Coventry)
 No Such Thing As Society: Photography in Britain 1968-1987, 2008-2010, Hayward Gallery, London, and touring (Aberystwyth Arts Centre, Wales; Tullie House, Carlisle; City Art Gallery, Leeds; The Exchange, Penzance; Ujazdowski Castle Centre for Contemporary Arts, Warsaw, Poland; Arbets Museum, Norrkoping, Sweden; National Museum of Wales, Cardiff; Laing Art Gallery, Newcastle upon Tyne)
 London By Night, 1983, The Photographers’ Gallery, London
London Nights, Museum of London, London, May–November 2018
Idea of North, Baltic Centre for Contemporary Art, Gateshead, UK, 2018
Distinctly, Pingyao International Photography Festival, Pingyao, China, September 2018. Work by Murtha and Martin Parr, Chris Killip, Daniel Meadows, John Myers, Markéta Luskačová, Robert Darch, Ken Grant, Paul Seawright, Niall McDiarmid, Elaine Constantine, and Kirsty Mackay.

Notes

References

External links 

1956 births
2013 deaths
Documentary photographers
English women photographers
Social documentary photographers
Women photojournalists